Marcel Mouly (February 6, 1918 – January 7, 2008) was a French artist who painted in an abstract style.

Early life

Mouly was born in Paris, France, on February 6, 1918. His interest in art developed in grade school. Mouly was first sent to drawing class as a form of punishment. At age 13, he left school to work, first as a beach vendor, then as an apprentice to a local dentist and later for a wine merchant delivering heavy baskets of wine. In 1935, while still employed by the wine merchant, Mouly began taking night classes in the arts at French Academies, the Cours Montparnasse 80, where he remained until he served in military duty during the Second World War beginning in 1938. After France fell to Germany in June 1940, Mouly became a civilian again, and earned a living working odd jobs. Mouly befriended an artist named Bernard la Fourcade, and the two established a studio in Auteuil. During a trip to Normandy in 1942, they were stopped by German officials and questioned for their lack of travel documentation, which was then required by the Vichy government.  Mouly and la Fourcade were arrested shortly after their return to Paris, and mistakenly imprisoned as spies. During his solitary confinement, Mouly solidified his plans to become an artist.

Career
Shortly after being released from prison, Mouly, along with fellow artist Édouard Pignon, rented the Boulogne studio of famed modernist sculptor Jacques Lipchitz (1891–1973).  Mouly learned from Lipchitz, particularly about the style of cubism.  By the mid-1940s, Mouly's art began to gain notoriety from his peers and collectors. In 1945, his paintings were exhibited alongside the paintings of Matisse in the Salon d'Automne in Paris. The following year he moved to La Ruche where he became friends with Picasso, Chagall, and Klein, and exhibited at the Salon du Mai.  Mouly's first one-person exhibition was held in 1949 at the Libraire Bergamasque.

Mouly's style was influenced by the deep, bold colors typically used in Matisse's fauvist works, and by the cubism of Picasso.  Beginning in the mid-1950s, Mouly created many lithographs.

Fame and honors

Marcel Mouly's work has been exhibited all over the world, including in the permanent collections of more than 20 museums, such as the Museum of Modern Art in Paris, the Museum of Modern Art in Japan, the Museum of Geneva, the Museum of Modern Art in Helsinki, and Paris' Bibliotheque Nationale. He has also been the subject of numerous books, and recognized by such honors as the Chevalier de L'Orde des Arts et Lettres (1957) and the Premier Prix de Lithographie (1973).

Marcel Mouly died on January 7, 2008, a month before his 90th birthday. "His art is pure and direct in its message," said art historian and writer Joseph Jacobs. "It is an art about beauty and life, and art roots firmly planted in the School of Paris.  Picasso, Braque, Matisse, Rouault, Vlaminck, Chagall, Vuillard and Dufy are his patrimony, and he has carried their mantel with unflagging dedication."

Exhibitions
1990 - Atelier Gourdon, Palm Springs
1996 - Musee de Shanghai, China
1997 - Kwai Fung Hin Gallery, Hong Kong
1997 - Park West Gallery, Michigan
1997 - Le Domaine Perdu Galerie Meyral Perigerd, with his son Pierre, a sculptor
1998 - Philipps Gallery, Palm Beach, Florida
1999 - Opera Gallery, Paris
1999 - University Museum, Carbondale, Illinois with Pierre Mouly
1999 - Galerie Nolan Rankin, Houston, Texas with Pierre Mouly
2000 - Galerie du Chateau, Noirmoutier, France
2000 - Park West Gallery, Michigan
2005 - Chok Som Bo Kum Pao Gallery, Guangzhou
2006 - Opera Gallery, Paris
2007 - National Fine Art Canada

Collections
The Centre Pompidou, France 
Queensland Art Gallery|Gallery of Modern Art (QAGOMA), Brisbane, Australia

References

1918 births
2008 deaths
20th-century French painters
20th-century French male artists
French male painters
21st-century French painters
21st-century French male artists
Chevaliers of the Ordre des Arts et des Lettres
Modern painters
Fauvism